Parnell is an unincorporated community in Grattan Township, Kent County, Michigan, United States. Its latitude is 43.043 and its longitude is -85.411.

History 
The area in which it is currently located was once the home of the Ottawa people. After the 1836 Treaty of Washington opened up the land for European settlement, the former inhabitants were quickly replaced by Europeans. In the late 1830s and '40s, Irish immigrants settled the area, which had the advantages of prime farmland and a location reasonably close to a metropolitan center, Grand Rapids, Michigan. By 1844, it is estimated that 20-30 Irish families were settled in the area now known as Parnell. That year, the community came together to worship with a priest sent from Grand Rapids, most frequently in the home of Michael Farrell. By the end of the year, planning for St. Patrick's Catholic Church had begun. The current structure, dating from 1878, is located across the street from the original church. The steeple of the church was renovated in 2005.

Saint Patrick School in Parnell was founded by Catholic priest James Crumley in 1893, and moved into its current building in 1963. The school serves children from preschool through 8th grade.

Parnell is also the home of a monastery of Discalced Carmelite nuns, founded in 1916.

Education
Lowell Area Schools operates area public schools. Murray Lake Elementary School serves Parnell, while Lowell Middle School and Lowell High School serve the entire district.

References

External links 
 St. Patrick Parish
 History of St. Patrick's Catholic Church: Parnell, Grattan Township, Kent County, Michigan

Unincorporated communities in Kent County, Michigan
Unincorporated communities in Michigan